

Events

January 

 8 January – Kwasi Kwarteng is appointed Secretary of State for Business, Energy and Industrial Strategy, replacing Alok Sharma who became the new President for COP26. Kwarteng is replaced as Minister of State for Business, Energy and Clean Growth by Anne-Marie Trevelyan, the former Secretary of State for International Development. He also became the first black politician of any party to have been appointed Secretary of State.
11 January – James Brokenshire takes a leave of absence as Minister for Security.
11 January – Michelle Ballantyne becomes the Leader of Reform UK Scotland.
21 January – Former Brexit Party Member of the European Parliament Robert Rowland dies in a diving accident.
23 January – Paul Davies resigns as leader of the Welsh Conservatives following a possible breach of COVID-19 regulations. Darren Miller also resigns from the Conservative front bench over the same issue.
24 January – Andrew RT Davies is appointed leader of the Welsh Conservatives following a short discussion between Conservative Senedd members.

February 

 3 February – Neale Hanvey is appointed as the Scottish National Party's Shadow Minister for COVID Vaccine Deployment.
 6 February – Neale Hanvey is sacked from the Frontbench Team of Ian Blackford.
 26 February – A Supreme Court ruling agrees unanimously against a legal challenge made by Shamima Begum.
 27 February – Anas Sarwar defeats Monica Lennon in the 2021 Scottish Labour leadership election.

March 

 2 March – The following ministerial appointments are made:  Suella Braveman is designated as a Minister on Leave, Michael Ellis replaces her as acting Attorney General for England and Wales and Advocate General for Northern Ireland. Lucy Frazer replaces Ellis as Solicitor General for England and Wales, and joins the Privy Council.
10 March – Patrick Grady MP resigns as SNP Chief Whip.
11 March – A by-election was held in the ward of Aird and Loch Ness to elect one candidate to win a seat on the Highland Council.
16 March – Labour MP for Hartlepool Mike Hill resigns from the House of Commons due to his employment tribunal later in the year following allegations of sexual harassment and victimisation.
18 March – A by-election was held in the ward of Helensburgh and Lomond South to elect one candidate to win a seat on Argyll and Bute Council.
23 March – The Committee on the Scottish Government Handling of Harassment Complaints of the Scottish Parliament releases its final report.
26 March – The public launch of the Alba Party, founded by former Scottish National Party leader Alex Salmond.
27 March – A number of defections to the Alba Party from the Scottish National Party; sitting MPs Kenny MacAskill and Neale Hanvey. Former MP Corri Wilson also defects.
27 March – A number of parliamentarians have sanctions placed on them by China; MPs Iain Duncan Smith, Nusrat Ghani, Tim Loughton, Tom Tugendhat, Neil O'Brien and peers Baroness Kennedy and Lord Alton, who are all members of the Inter-Parliamentary Alliance on China.

April 

13 to 15 April –  2021 Lord Speaker election
20 April – Conservative MP Johnny Mercer is sacked as Minister for Veterans by Boris Johnson.

May 

 1 May – John McFall, Baron McFall of Alcluith becomes the Lord Speaker
5 May – French fishermen protest off Jersey as part of the Jersey fishing licences dispute.
6 May:
 A series of elections took place for local councils and directly elected mayors in England, as well as police and crime commissioners in England and Wales
 Welsh Parliament election
 Scottish Parliament election
 London Assembly election
 London mayoral election
2021 Hartlepool by-election
The National Assembly for Wales officially changes its name to Senedd Cymru/Welsh Parliament.
8 May – Steve Aiken resigns as the leader of the Ulster Unionist Party.
9 May – 2021 Shadow Cabinet reshuffle
11 May – 2021 State Opening of Parliament
13 May – 
2021 Airdrie and Shotts by-election
Lord Benyon is appointed Parliamentary Under-Secretary of State for Rural Affairs and Biosecurity.
14 May – May 2021 Democratic Unionist Party leadership election
28 May – Edwin Poots becomes Leader of the Democratic Unionist Party.

June 

 11 to 13 June: 47th G7 summit is held at Carbis Bay, Cornwall.
 17 June – Edwin Poots resigns as leader of the Democratic Unionist Party, having only been in position for 21 days, triggering a new leadership contest: see June 2021 Democratic Unionist Party leadership election. Paul Givan becomes First Minister of Northern Ireland.
 17 June – 2021 Chesham and Amersham by-election.
 22 June – Jeffrey Donaldson is elected unopposed in the June 2021 Democratic Unionist Party leadership election.
 26 June – Matt Hancock resigns as Secretary of State for Health and Social Care.

July 

 1 July – 2021 Batley and Spen by-election.
2 July – Angela Merkel made a visit to the UK, her last as Chancellor of Germany.
5 July – Jonathan Bartley stands down as leader of the Green Party of England and Wales.
7 July – James Brokenshire tenders his resignation as Minister for Security to Prime Minister Boris Johnson, stating his recovery from lung cancer was "taking longer than expected"

August 

 13 August – Damian Hinds returned to government as Minister of State for Security following the resignation of James Brokenshire on health grounds.
 18 August – Parliament was recalled due to the situation in Afghanistan.
19 August – 2021 Wiltshire Police and Crime Commissioner by-election
31 August – The Scottish National Party and the Scottish Greens sign a power sharing agreement.

September 

 2 September – The 2021 Green Party of England and Wales leadership election begins.
15 September – Boris Johnson carries out his second major cabinet reshuffle, same day, AUKUS is announced
17 September – Liberal Democrats annual conference opens in Canary Wharf.
23 September – 2021 Green Party of England and Wales leadership election ends.
25 September – The 2021 Labour Party Conference opens in Brighton, East Sussex.
27 September – Andy McDonald resigns from the Shadow Cabinet of Keir Starmer.

October 

 1 October – It is announced that Carla Denyer and Adrian Ramsay won the 2021 Green Party of England and Wales leadership election.
 1 October – Reform UK conference opened in Manchester.
 3 October – The 2021 Conservative Party Conference opens in Manchester.
 7 October – Conservative MP for Old Bexley and Sidcup James Brokenshire dies from lung cancer at the age of 53.
13 October – Labour MP for Leicester East Claudia Webbe found guilty of harassment. The Labour Party called on her to resign from parliament.
15 October – Conservative MP for Southend West David Amess is murdered after being stabbed at a constituency surgery at a Methodist church in Leigh-on-Sea. Police are investigating it as a terror attack.
27 October – October 2021 United Kingdom budget was unveiled by Chancellor Rishi Sunak.
31 October – 2021 United Nations Climate Change Conference (COP26) begins in Glasgow.

November 
4 November – Owen Paterson, Conservative MP for North Shropshire announces his resignation from parliament.
4 November – Claudia Webbe MP for Leicester East expelled from the Labour Party following sentencing.
24 November – November 2021 English Channel disaster
25 November – 2021 North Yorkshire Police, Fire and Crime Commissioner by-election
27 November – Boris Johnson announces new measures for England in response to the new SARS-CoV-2 Omicron variant

December 
2 December – Old Bexley and Sidcup by-election
16 December – 2021 North Shropshire by-election

Events in the year 
 Greensill scandal
 Westminster Christmas parties controversy

See also 

 General politics timelines by year
 2020 in politics and government
 Other UK timelines by year
 2020 in the United Kingdom
 Decade articles
 2010s in political history
 2010s in United Kingdom political history
 Other country timelines
 2021 in United States politics and government
 Draft articles:
 2020s in United Kingdom political history

Specific situations and issues 

 Premiership of Boris Johnson
Chancellorship of Rishi Sunak

References

External links
UK-Africa trade: What will Brexit change? (by Kate Hairsine, DW, January 18, 2021)

2021 in British politics
Political timelines of the 2020s by year
United Kingdom politics and government
2021 in the United Kingdom
Political timelines of the United Kingdom